Kyadet  is a town in Salingyi Township, Monywa District, in southern Sagaing Region, Myanmar. Kyadet is at a crossroads with one route going north-east to Pale, one running north to Salingyi, and a third running south-east to Lingadaw.

Notes

External links
Satellite map at Maplandia.com

Populated places in Sagaing Region